Tundzha Glacier is a glacier on Livingston Island in the South Shetland Islands, Antarctica situated east-southeast of Berkovitsa Glacier, west of Saedinenie Snowfield, northwest of Pimpirev Glacier, north of Kamchiya Glacier and east-northeast of Verila Glacier. It is bounded by Snow Peak to the west, Teres Ridge to the east and the glacial divide between the Drake Passage and Bransfield Strait to the south.

The feature was named after the Tundzha River in Bulgaria.

Location

See also
 List of glaciers in the Antarctic
 Glaciology

Maps
 L.L. Ivanov et al. Antarctica: Livingston Island and Greenwich Island, South Shetland Islands. Scale 1:100000 topographic map. Sofia: Antarctic Place-names Commission of Bulgaria, 2005.
 L.L. Ivanov. Antarctica: Livingston Island and Greenwich, Robert, Snow and Smith Islands. Scale 1:120000 topographic map. Troyan: Manfred Wörner Foundation, 2010.  (First edition 2009. )
 Antarctic Digital Database (ADD). Scale 1:250000 topographic map of Antarctica. Scientific Committee on Antarctic Research (SCAR). Since 1993, regularly upgraded and updated.
 L.L. Ivanov. Antarctica: Livingston Island and Smith Island. Scale 1:100000 topographic map. Manfred Wörner Foundation, 2017.

References
 Tundzha Glacier SCAR Composite Antarctic Gazetteer
 Bulgarian Antarctic Gazetteer. Antarctic Place-names Commission. (details in Bulgarian, basic data in English)

External links
 Tundzha Glacier. Copernix satellite image

Glaciers of Livingston Island